Nodiko "Nodar" Tatishvili (born November 5, 1986) is a Georgian singer.

Biography
He was six years old when he made his first appearance in the Tbilisi Great Concert Hall. He was a soloist of children ensemble. At the age of eight, he won the national contest and already at age nine singing with the ensemble Iveria in the musical Two Dwarfs.
During the "mutation period" Nodiko took a part in the television project "School of Nutsa" and after that many popular composers and musicians.
In the periods from 2005 to 2009, Nodiko has participated in many prestigious music festivals and projects, but in 2009 he was featured in the popular Georgian TV show Geostar, where he won and became GEOSTAR 2009(pop idol 2009)

He and Sopho Gelovani represented Georgia in the Eurovision Song Contest 2013 in Malmö, Sweden. In the Eurovision Song Contest 2015 in Vienna, Austria, he and Sophie Gelovani were two of the five members of the Georgian jury.

Awards
 2005 – International Music Festival Palanga 2005, Lithuania
 2005 – The Amber Star, Lithuania
 2007 – international Song Contest "Astana 2007", Kazakhstan
 2007 – Shanghai-Malaysian International Song contest, awarded as The Best Male Voice, Malaysia
 2008 – "Slaviansky Bazar", Awarded for the second place, Belarus
 2009 – International Song Contest "Golden Voices", awarded for the third place, Moldova
 2009 – Geostar, Winner of the Project, Georgia

See also
 Geostar

References

External links
 
 
 

1986 births
Living people
21st-century male singers from Georgia (country)
Eurovision Song Contest entrants of 2013
Eurovision Song Contest entrants for Georgia (country)